The canton of Ceyzériat  is an administrative division in eastern France. At the French canton reorganisation which came into effect in March 2015, the canton was expanded from 11 to 22 communes:
 
Certines
Ceyzériat
Chalamont
Châtenay
Châtillon-la-Palud
Crans
Dompierre-sur-Veyle
Druillat
Journans
Lent
Montagnat
Le Plantay
Revonnas
Saint-André-sur-Vieux-Jonc
Saint-Just
Saint-Martin-du-Mont
Saint-Nizier-le-Désert
Servas 
Tossiat
La Tranclière
Versailleux
Villette-sur-Ain

Demographics

See also
Cantons of the Ain department 
Communes of France

References

Cantons of Ain